Fier-Shegan is a village and a former municipality in the Fier County, western Albania. At the 2015 local government reform it became a subdivision of the municipality Lushnjë. The population at the 2011 census was 7,023.

References 

Former municipalities in Fier County
Administrative units of Lushnjë
Villages in Fier County